Pierluigi Marquis (born 30 May 1964) is an Italian politician, and the President of Aosta Valley since 10 March until 11 October 2017.

References

1964 births
Living people
Presidents of Aosta Valley
Politicians of Aosta Valley